The Signet cyclecar was the name used by Fenton Engineering Company of Fenton, Michigan from 1913 to 1914.  In 1914 the name was changed to Fenton and was manufactured by the Fenton Cyclecar Company.  In May 1914, The Fenton became the Koppin and was produced by the Koppin Motor Company until September 1914.

History 
Oscar J, Howick, formerly of Lozier and Packard, developed the Signet cyclecar with a Spacke DeLuxe twin-cylinder air-cooled engine, belt drive and friction transmission. The body styling with a deep vee front, full doors and fenders, and leather upholstery was more elegant than the average cyclecar. The wheelbase was 96 inches and the tread 36-inches. Two passengers sat side-by-side in the cyclecar with a package shelf behind them.  Introduced as the Fenton in November 1913, the price was $375, .

George Jenks, a former automobile salesman, was the mover behind the Fenton and organized the Fenton Cyclecar Company to succeed Fenton Engineering Company to market the car.  On March 23, 1914, tragedy struck with the sudden death of George Jenks.  The Fenton Cyclecar Company was reorganized within two months as the Koppin Motor Company by H.S. Koppin, who owned the former A. J. Phillips plant in Fenton.  The Fenton became the Koppin until September 1914, when the plant was destroyed by fire.

References

 

Defunct motor vehicle manufacturers of the United States
Motor vehicle manufacturers based in Michigan
Defunct manufacturing companies based in Michigan
Cyclecars
Brass Era vehicles
Cars introduced in 1913
Vehicle manufacturing companies established in 1913
Vehicle manufacturing companies disestablished in 1914
1910s cars